Clifton Webb (1889–1966) was an American actor.

Clifton Webb may also refer to:

Clifton Webb (sailor) (born 1978), New Zealand sailor
Clifton Webb (politician) (1889–1962), New Zealand politician